DC Studios Inc. was a British video game developer based in Montreal, Canada. Founded by Mark Greenshields in December 1999, it was originally located in Glasgow, and later expanded to Montreal, Edinburgh, and Dublin. Following the underperformance of State of Emergency 2, which the company had acquired from VIS Entertainment, DC Studios closed its Scotland operations in June 2006. The remaining Montreal office was closed in September 2007. Both offices were replaced by ones for Greenshields' newer venture, Firebrand Games.

History 
DC Studios was founded on 3 December 1999. Mark Greenshields set it up in Glasgow, after leaving Steel Monkeys, another Scotland-based development studio, earlier that year. In November 2000, the company expanded with a second outfit located in Montreal. In August 2003, Andrew McLennan left his position as commercial director from Steel Monkeys, at the time run by his brother Derek as managing director, to join DC Studio as business development director. In April 2005, backed by the Irish government, DC Studios opened a development studio in Dublin, seeking to employ 50 further staff.

In May 2005, the company acquired the rights to State of Emergency 2 from the defunct developer VIS Entertainment. Following its release, however, the game severely underperformed in sales, due to which DC Studios announced on 4 June 2006 that it had ceased all operations in the United Kingdom, laying off all 29 staff from its Edinburgh office. The Montreal office remained open, at the time with 55 employees. It was eventually shut down in favour of opening a Florida office for Greenshields' newer venture, Firebrand Games, on 25 September 2007.

Games developed

References 

1999 establishments in Scotland
Defunct video game companies of Canada
Video game companies disestablished in 2007
Video game companies established in 1999
Video game development companies